William Stanton Pilcher (January 5, 1803 – August 14, 1858) was the eleventh mayor of Louisville, Kentucky, serving from 1857 to 1858.

Pilcher was born in Stafford County, Virginia to a wealthy manufacturing family. He came to Louisville in 1833 to study law.

Pilcher unsuccessfully ran for lieutenant governor in 1844 as a Jacksonian Democrat, but was elected mayor of Louisville on the Know Nothing party on April 4, 1857, in a landslide. However, by May 13, 1858, he was too ill to continue his duties, and he died on August 14, 1858, becoming the first mayor of Louisville to die in office.

References

 
 

1803 births
1858 deaths
People from Stafford County, Virginia
Mayors of Louisville, Kentucky
Kentucky Know Nothings
Kentucky Jacksonians